Le Taillefer is a mountain in the Dauphiné Alps, culminating at a height of . It is located south-east of Grenoble, and is the highest mountain in the Taillefer Massif.

References 

Mountains of the Alps
Mountains of Isère